On 19 July 2021, a thirteen-year old, Secondary One male student was allegedly struck to death with an axe at River Valley High School in Boon Lay, Singapore. The suspected attacker was a sixteen-year-old Secondary Four male student, who was arrested shortly after the incident, which was reportedly unprecedented in the history of Singapore.

Attack and aftermath
The attack occurred between 11:16 a.m. and 11:44 a.m. local time at a fourth floor toilet in River Valley High School. A group of students encountered the suspecta sixteen-year-old Secondary Four studentoutside the toilet at 11:35 a.m. with an axe. When the suspect asked them to call the police, the students retreated to their classroom and instated a lockdown drill. The suspect then went to a classroom to make the same request, upon which the second group also instated a lockdown. Both groups alerted their teachers.

A teacher confronted the suspect and requested that the axe be placed on the floor. The suspect complied with the instruction and was escorted to a meeting room. The victima thirteen-year-old, Secondary One male studentwas then found dead inside the toilet, having suffered multiple wounds allegedly caused by the axe. 

The suspect was subsequently arrested by the Singapore Police Force. The entire school was placed into lockdown until around 3:30 p.m. As the following day was Hari Raya Haji, a public holiday, students returned to the school on 21 July. In the days following the attack, counselling was provided for nearly 540 students and teachers, while personnel from the Ministry of Education took over some classes.

Suspect
According to a statement released by the Singapore Police Force several hours after the incident, preliminary investigations revealed that the two male teenagers are not known to each other." It was also revealed that the alleged perpetrator had previously attempted suicide two years before and had been remanded in the Institute of Mental Health. He is alleged to have procured the axe used in the attack online. According to Channel 8 News, the suspect had simply wanted to attack the first person to enter the toilet.

The Secondary Four student, who cannot be named due to Singaporean law on account of his age, was charged with murder on 20 July and remanded at the Complex Medical Centre within Changi Prison for psychiatric evaluation. As a minor, he is protected by the Children and Young Persons Act and cannot be sentenced to death if found guilty of the murder charge, with the maximum sentence being life imprisonment. Criminal lawyer Peter Fernando was assigned to defend the suspect in his trial.

On 10 August, a fresh court order was issued to extend the suspect's period of psychiatric remand by another two weeks. By then, Fernando had been replaced by Diana Ngiam and Sunil Sudheesan. The suspect was allowed a phone call with his family three days later. He was further remanded on 24 August 2021 for seven days, even though he had completed his psychiatric evaluations. On 31 August, his case was adjourned to 19 October. No date for his trial was scheduled at present. It was also revealed the suspect had been allowed to meet his family, and that he would be transferred to Changi Prison.

On 30 December 2022, it was reported that the boy remained in remand pending trial, and under the arrangements made between the prison authorities and the boy's lawyer Sunil Sudheesan, the teenager had taken his O-levels as a private candidate while behind bars in November 2022. His case was expected to be heard on 25 January 2023.

On 24 February 2023, the murder charge against the student, who turned 18 in January, was reduced to culpable homicide not amounting to murder, an offence which was punishable by life imprisonment or up to twenty years in prison, in addition to caning.

Responses
According to local newspaper The Straits Times, the attack was unprecedented in the history of Singapore. Both Prime Minister Lee Hsien Loong and Minister for Education Chan Chun Sing wrote on Facebook that they were "shocked", while the Ministry of Education and River Valley High School said that they were "deeply saddened" by the incident. President Halimah Yacob opined that "parents, schools and our society are ill-equipped to deal with this situation." Minister for Law and Home Affairs K. Shanmugam said that it was "difficult to even describe the true extent of their (the victim's parents') grief". Several other Cabinet members and local religious leaders also publicly commented on the attack.

The attack sparked concerns over mental health in Singapore. Member of Parliament Patrick Tay questioned the decision to return students to school a day after the attack. Minister for Education Chan Chun Sing defended his decision and replied that the ministry had decided that it was better for the students to grieve together than alone at home. Students were allowed to stay home if they chose. 

In a Ministerial Statement, Minister for Education Chan Chun Sing announced on 27 July the removal of Common Last Topics from the GCE N, O and A-Levels, and some topics from the final year examinations "to help ease stress". Measures were also put in place, including having all teachers equipped with enhanced mental health literacy, boosting the number of teacher-counsellors from 700 in 2021 to more than 1,000 several years later, recruiting more school counsellors or redeploying teachers to these roles, resuming CCAs at the secondary and pre-university level due to vaccinations, and dedicating more time to check on students' well-being. Measures to strengthen schools' security will be undertaken without eroding trust in the community. A buddy system was later proposed to be implemented in schools.

See also
 2021 in Singapore

References

2021 in Singapore
High school killings